Dennys Jack Valentine McDonald-Hobley (9 June 1917, Stanley, Falkland Islands – 30 July 1987) was one of the earliest BBC Television continuity announcers, appearing on screen from 1946 to 1956.

Childhood and early career
Hobley (pronounced to rhyme with 'nobly') was the son of Charles McDonald Hobley, the naval chaplain at the cathedral in Stanley, Falkland Islands, and his wife Gladys, née Blanchard. He was christened Dennys Jack Valentine McDonald-Hobley and attended Brighton College, England, a public school, from 1931 to 1936. He began his acting career in repertory theatre, under the stage names Val Blanchard and Robert Blanchard, using his mother's maiden name, and toured before the Second World War in J. B. Priestley's Time and the Conways.

War service
During the Second World War, Hobley served with the Royal Artillery. He was involved in an ultimately abandoned plot to abduct Adolf Hitler and bring him to Britain. He also served in Ceylon with the British Forces Broadcasting Service.

Post-war
After being demobbed, Hobley was selected as an announcer for the post-war revival of BBC Television.

He was also one of the comperes on the BBC's Come Dancing programme and appeared on various other shows as himself. He headed the team of BBC TV's early continuity announcers, which included Peter Haigh, Mary Malcolm and Sylvia Peters. He once introduced the politician Sir Stafford Cripps as 'Sir Stifford Crapps'. Hobley was also a presenter of BBC TV's For Deaf Children from 1953 to 1955.

He left the BBC in 1956 to join Granada Television for its opening. He returned to present It's a Knockout in 1966. During that year, he also returned to radio, fronting the Coffee Break Show on the pirate station Wonderful Radio London. On BBC radio, he was chairman of Does The Team Think?. To celebrate the 50th anniversary of BBC Television, he re-appeared in November 1986, as an in-vision announcer on BBC 2.

He played himself as a beauty pageant judge in the 1960 film The Entertainer based on the play by John Osborne starring Laurence Olivier.

Hobley appeared in London's West End in the farce No Sex Please, We're British and appeared in It Ain't Half Hot Mum and The Goodies, among other programmes. Just before his death, he returned to the Falkland Islands for a Channel 4 broadcast about the then British South Atlantic Dependencies. In July 1987, he was rehearsing the world premiere of Anthony Marriott and Bob Grant's play "Home is Where Your Clothes Are" produced by David Tudor. He had extreme difficulty learning his lines, which was unusual, and David Tudor had to release him from his contract. He died during recovery from an operation to remove a cancerous tumour in his head, when he suffered a fatal heart attack.

References

External links

1917 births
1987 deaths
BBC people
British Army personnel of World War II
Falkland Islands soldiers
Falkland Islands television people
People from Stanley, Falkland Islands
Radio and television announcers
Royal Artillery officers
People educated at Brighton College